Kandhkot is a city and tehsil in Kashmore District in the Sindh province of Pakistan. It is the 98th largest city of Pakistan with a population of 100,698 according to the 2017 census.

In the last quarter of 2022, Kandhkot along with other many cities in Sindh, was struck by major flooding. Many people died in the city due to heavy rainfall resulting in urban flooding.

The Sindh government, under the Public Private Partnership initiative, planned to construct a bridge on the River Indus to provide better connectivity between Khairpur, Nathanshah, and Kandiaro.The Chief Minister, Syed Murad Ali Shah, presided over the meeting where the decision was made. The construction of the Ghotki-Kandhkot bridge on the Indus River is expected to be completed by July 2023. Additionally, a link road to the M-9 motorway will also be constructed.

History
The current city of Kandhkot is about 200 years old. Kalhora Dynasty established the fort here within their ending days. After Kalhora's, this area remained under the territory of Talpur's known as Mir till 1841, Khangarh now Jacobabad, handed over to East India through Treaty. Kandhkot was a small village during that time with a population of about 100 souls.

The term Kandhkot refers to the city on the bank of a river, but it is a fabricated meaning. On the banks of the river Indus, many forts that are still in use were constructed, but none of them have the name of the fort on the river.

Gas and oil field 
Kandhkot gas field was discovered in 1959. Kandhkot gas field’s reserves are concentrated in the Habib Rahi Limestone, Sui Main and Upper Limestone reservoirs. Although Kandhkot gas field was discovered shortly after Sui gas field, production did not begin until 1987 due to low gas demand.

The CEO of Engro Powergen Qadirpur announced that Pakistan could have saved up to $2 billion annually by utilizing the Kandhkot gas field to supply fuel to its Qadirpur power plant.The Kandhkot gas field, located in Sindh province, was one of the largest gas fields in the country, and its utilization could have helped reduce the country's reliance on imported gas. The Qadirpur power plant, which was previously fueled by imported liquefied natural gas, had a generation capacity of 217 MW and played a crucial role in the country's energy mix.

References 

Populated places in Kashmore District
Talukas of Sindh